Pavel Ponkratov (born 15 July 1988) is a Russian chess player. He was awarded the title Grandmaster by FIDE in 2010.

Together with 43 other Russian chess players, Ponkratov signed an open letter to Russian president Vladimir Putin, protesting against the 2022 Russian invasion of Ukraine and expressing solidarity with the  Ukrainian people.

Career
In July 2020, Ponkratov won the International Chess Open "Ciudad de Leon". In January 2021, he won the Chennai Open. In April 2021, he won the Chelyabinskiy Variant A.

He participated in the Chess World Cup 2021.

In 2022, he won the 1st Guwahati GM chess championship on tie-break with Adham Fawzy with a score 8.5/10.

References

External links
 
 
 
 

1988 births
Living people
Chess grandmasters
Russian chess players